Olga Alekseyevna Dmitrieva, born 26 June 1981 in Saint Peterburg, is a Russian professional triathlete and member of the Russian National Team.

Career 
In the 2009 Russian Triathlon Federation's ranking, Dmitrieva was the number 1. She also won the Russian Cup in 2009 although she took part in only 3 of the relevant 10 races.
At the Russian Championships of the year 2010 she won the supersprint silver medal and she won bronze on the Olympic Distance.

At the World Military Triathlon Championship of the year 2006 in Satenas, Sweden, Dmitrieva won the gold medal with her Russian team and placed 3rd in the individual ranking. At the Military Championship of the year 2008 in Otepää, Estonia, Dmitrieva won the silver medal in the team ranking and placed 4th in the individual ranking.

In 2009, Dmitrieva also took part in the prestigious French Club Championship Series Lyonnaise des Eaux and represented the club Charleville Tri Ardennes. At the triathlon in Longchamp (Paris), for instance, Olga Dmitrieva placed 19th and thus proved to be the club's best elite triathlete, followed by the foreign athletes Danne Boterenbrood (20th) from the Netherlands, Karolien Geerts (32nd) from Belgium, and Alia Cardinale Villalobos (35th) from Costa Rica.
At the Grand Final of the Club Championship Series in La Baule Dmitrieva placed 20th and was the second best among the CHARLEVILLE triathletes and this time it was Katrien Verstuyft from Belgium to be the best Charleville triathlete (18th).

ITU Competitions 
In the nine years from 2002 to 2010, Dmitrieva took part in 45 ITU competitions and achieved 18 top ten positions.
The following list is based upon the official ITU rankings and the Athlete's Profile Page.
Unless indicated otherwise the following events are triathlons (Olympic Distance) and belong to the Elite category.

BG = the sponsor British Gas · DNF = did not finish · DNS = did not start · DSQ = disqualified

External links 
 Dmitrieva's ITU Profile Page
 FTR Russian Triathlon federation in Russian
 Dmitrieva's FTR Profile Page in Russian

Notes 

Russian female triathletes
1981 births
Living people